Anni is a 1948 Austrian-German romance film directed by Max Neufeld and starring Elfie Mayerhofer, Siegfried Breuer and Josef Meinrad. It is part of the genre of Vienna films.

The film was shot at the Rosenhügel Studios in Vienna with sets designed by the art director Fritz Jüptner-Jonstorff.

Cast
Elfie Mayerhofer as Anni Huber
Siegfried Breuer as Alexander Radkofsky
Josef Meinrad as Heinrich Buchgraber
Elisabeth Markus as Fürstin Paula v. Metternich
Annie Rosar as Frau Sacher
Lotte Neumayer as Tante Ernestine
Willy Danek as Bergauer
Alexander Fischer-Marich as Antiquitätenhändler
Pepi Glöckner-Kramer as Frau Hofer, Wirtin Radkofskys
Theodor Grieg as Vater Huber
Gisela Horn as Frau Radkofsky
Hilde Jaeger as Mutter Huber
Eduard Kautzner as Kellner im Hotel Sacher
Hanns Kurth as Bösendorfer
Mimi Mischka-Marik as Paula
Eugen Neufeld as Direktor Jahn
Eugen Preiß as Franz Liszt

References

External links

Austrian historical films
1940s historical romance films
Austrian romance films
German romance films
Austrian black-and-white films
German black-and-white films
German historical films
Films directed by Max Neufeld
Films set in Vienna
Films set in the 1880s
Films set in the 1890s
Films shot at Rosenhügel Studios
1940s German-language films